The Justice of Bunny King is a New Zealand film directed by Gaysorn Thavat and starring Essie Davis and Thomasin McKenzie. The film was Thavat's feature directorial debut. It premiered on 29 July 2021.

Plot summary
Bunny King is a single mother who has served time in prison for manslaughter after killing her abusive husband Bryan King. A homeless Bunny plies a living cleaning car windows in Auckland. Due to her criminal conviction and homelessness, Bunny is denied visitation rights to her two children Reuben and Shannon by Government Family Service (GFS) social workers. 

Unable to find a home to rent, Bunny finds shelter with her sister Grace and her husband Bevan, who allow her to stay in return for cooking, babysitting their children, and washing their car. This arrangement falls apart after Bunny discovers Bevan molesting his step-daughter Tonyah. When Bunny reports the abuse to Grace, Bevan claims that he was giving Tonyah a driving lesson. Grace chooses to believe Bevan over Bunny and her daughter Tonyah, forcing Bunny to leave.

Bunny subsequently finds shelter with the family of a Samoan window cleaner named Semu. Semu's mother helps Bunny to secure visitation rights for Shannon's fifth birthday by posing as her landlord. In addition, Bunny manages to gain access to a luxury inner-city apartment by posing as a wealthy prospective buyer. Bunny plans to secure a place to live for Reuben, Shannon, and Tonyah in order to protect the latter from her abusive step-father. After stealing Bevan's car, Bunny invites Tonyah to live with her in the inner-city apartment.

However, Bunny's plan to regain visitation rights to her children falls apart after she makes an unauthorised visit to the children's foster parents. As a result, Bunny's children are resettled with a new foster family in Thames. Determined to attend Shannon's fifth birthday, Bunny travels with Tonyah to Thames. Tonyah's mother and step-father report that Bunny kidnapped their daughter and stole Bevan's car.

While attempting to locate her children's whereabouts at the local GFS office in Thames, Bunny is recognised as a fugitive by the social workers, who attempt to detain her. Bunny takes a social worker named Trish Reihana hostage. Detective Goodman initiates negotiations with Bunny, who demands that she be allowed to meet her children. In an attempt to defuse the crisis, Grace and Bevan attempt to convince Bunny to release Tonyah. However, Tonyah takes the opportunity to expose Bevan's abuse and to call out her mother for not protecting her.

After learning about Bunny's abuse at the hands of her late husband, Trish takes pity on Bunny and arranges for her to speak with her children via phone. Following an impromptu birthday part, Bunny agrees to surrender. While approaching the door, Bunny reaches for her pocket, leading members of the Armed Offenders Squad to believe she is reaching for a weapon and to shoot her in the arm. While paramedics attend to the wounded Bunny, Tonyah recovers the stolen car keys and escapes in her step-father's stolen car.

Cast
Essie Davis as Bunny King
Thomasin McKenzie as Tonyah
Amelie Baynes as Shannon
Angus Stevens as Reuben
Xana Tang as Ai Ling (case worker)
Toni Potter as Grace
Erroll Shand as Bevan
Phil Peleton as letting agent
Bronwyn Bradley as Lisa (Auckland case worker)
Tanea Heke as Trish (Thames case worker)
Ryan O'Kane as Detective Jerry Goodman

Production
Principal photography occurred in New Zealand in September 2019.

Release
The Justice of Bunny King premiered on 29 July 2021. The film was distributed in New Zealand by Madmen Entertainment. It was also screened at the Tribeca Film Festival, Revelation Perth International Film Festival, Sydney Film Festival, and the Melbourne International Film Festival.

Critical reception
Stuff's reviewer Graeme Tuckett awarded The Justice of Bunny King four and a half stars, describing it as "an angry, funny and deeply loveable gem of a movie." He praised Essie Davis' performance as the protagonist Bunny King and the work of director Gaysorn Thavat. Tuckett also credited the film for shedding light on the impersonality of New Zealand social services and the growing inequality between home owners and renters.

Newshub's reviewer Kate Rodger awarded the film five stars; praising Thavat's direction of the film, script writer Sophie Henderson's scriptwriting, and the cinematography of Ginny Loane and Cushla Dillon. She also praised the film for focusing on the "little-seen lives of women and families living with trauma, desperation and powerlessness and she's amazing."

The Spinoff's reviewer Rachel Kerr described The Justice of Bunny King as following in the tradition of British film-maker Ken Loach's I, Daniel Blake and popular New Zealand films such as Goodbye Pork Pie. Kerr also praised Davis' performance as Bunny, focusing on her ability to convey a range of emotions. She also described Thomasin McKenzie's performance as Bunny's abused niece Tonyah as "restrained and authentic, a subdued presence off-setting Bunny." Kerr also praised Loane's cinematography for conveying emotions and scriptwriter Henderson for combining elements of both social realism and the caper film genre.

References

External links
 

2021 films
2021 drama films
2020s New Zealand films
New Zealand drama films
2020s English-language films